Fulton Park is an  public park in southwest Portland, Oregon. The space was acquired in 1941.

References

External links

 

1941 establishments in Oregon
Parks in Portland, Oregon
Southwest Portland, Oregon